Senator Mansue may refer to:

Joseph W. Mansur (1808–1891), Massachusetts State Senate
Zophar M. Mansur (1843–1914), Vermont State Senate